Leucophylla is a genus of moth in the family Gelechiidae. It contains the species Leucophylla nigribasis, which is found in Namibia and South Africa.

References

Gelechiinae